Darband may refer to:

Afghanistan
 Darband, Afghanistan

Armenia
 Karmrakar, Armenia, formerly Darband

Iran

East Azerbaijan Province
Darband, East Azerbaijan, a village in Hashtrud County

Gilan Province
Darband, Astara, a village in Astara County
Darband Cave, a Lower Paleolithic site

Hamadan Province
Darband, Hamadan, a village in Bahar County

Hormozgan Province
Darband Salah, a village in Bashagard County

Isfahan Province
 Darband, Fereydunshahr, a village in Fereydunshahr County
 Darband, Khvansar, a village in Khvansar County

Kermanshah Province
 Darband Khizan, a village in Gilan-e Gharb County
 Darband Zard, a village in Kermanshah County
 Darband-e Zard-e Olya, a village in Salas-e Babajani County
 Darband-e Zard-e Sofla, a village in Salas-e Babajani County
 Darband, Kermanshah, a village in Sonqor County

Khuzestan Province
 Darband, Khuzestan, a village in Khorramshahr County, Khuzestan Province

Kurdistan Province
 Darband, Kurdistan, a village in Divandarreh County
 Darband-e Aziz, a village in Kamyaran County

Lorestan Province
 Darband, Lorestan, a village in Azna County
 Darband-e Kamalvand, a village in Khorramabad County

Markazi Province
 Darband, Markazi, a village in Saveh County
 Darband-e Loran, a village in Khomeyn County
 Darband-e Guyilagh, a village in Zarandieh County

North Khorasan Province
 Darband, Bojnord, a village in Bojnord County
 Darband, Jajrom, a village in Jajrom County
 Darband, Maneh and Samalqan, a village in Maneh and Samalqan County
 Darband Esfejir, a village in Faruj County
 Darband Rural District, an administrative subdivision of Jajrom County

Qazvin Province
 Darband, Qazvin, a village in Qazvin County, Qazvin Province, Iran

Razavi Khorasan Province
 Darband, Razavi Khorasan, a village in Khoshab County
 Darband-e Golriz, a village in Dargaz County
 Darband-e Olya, Dargaz, a village in Dargaz County
 Darband-e Sofla, Dargaz, a village in Dargaz County
 Darband-e Vosta, a village in Dargaz County
 Darband-e Olya, Sarakhs, a village in Sarakhs County
 Darband-e Sofla, Sarakhs, a village in Sarakhs County
 Darband, Taybad, a village in Taybad County

Semnan Province
 Darband, Semnan, a village in Mehdishahr County

Tehran Province
 Darband (Tehran), a village attached to Iran's capital Tehran

West Azerbaijan Province
 Darband, Naqadeh, a village in Naqadeh County
 Darband, Urmia, a village in Urmia County
 Darband, Baranduz, a village in Urmia County
 Darband, Silvaneh, a village in Urmia County

Zanjan Province
 Darband, Zanjan, a village in Khodabandeh County
 Darband, Tarom, a village in Tarom County

Pakistan
 Darband, Khyber Pakhtunkhwa, a settlement in Khyber Pakhtunkhwa
 Darband (Kech), a town in Balochistan

Russia
 Derbent, a city in the Caucasus

Tajikistan
 Darband, Tajikistan, a town or district in Tajikistan's Region of Republican Subordination

See also
 Darvand
 Derbent (disambiguation)